The Belize leaf-toed gecko (Phyllodactylus insularis) is a species of gecko native to Belize. It is a small, pale, large headed gecko only found on small islands off Belize's coast and was first described by James R. Dixon in 1960. This species is currently classified as "vulnerable" by the IUCN Red List.

Description 
The Belize leaf-toed gecko is a small, pale, large-headed gecko. It is nocturnal and emerges from under barks and limbs to feed on insects and other arthropods. Like other geckos it has adhesive friction pads on the toes of each foot. The gecko emits a sounds similar to a high pitched squeak or click.

Habitat 
The gecko lives in trees and can be found in littoral forests on small islands. It is endemic to lowland Maya forests. Sub adults are exclusively found under surface objects while adults are found solely on palm trunks

Distribution 
The Belize leaf-toed gecko has been recorded on Half Moon Caye, Long Caye, Twin Cayes, Glover's Reef, Crawl Caye, False Caye, Lagoon Caye, Peter Douglas Caye, Ambergris Caye and West Snake Caye off the coast of Belize.

Elevation 
Elevation ranges from sea level to 50 meters.

Reproduction 
They are oviparous and typically lay 1 or 2 eggs in a clutch

Predation 
Phyllodactus insularis is known to be preyed upon by rats.

Threats 
The IUCN Red List reports that habitat destruction caused by tourism development is a threat to this species. It is also threatened by sea level rise and storm surge.

See also 
 Fauna of Belize

References  

insularis
Reptiles of Belize
Endemic fauna of Belize
Reptiles described in 1960
Taxa named by James R. Dixon